"Malibu" is a song by American alternative rock band Hole. It is the fourth track and second single from the band's third studio album, Celebrity Skin, and was released on December 29, 1998, on DGC Records. The song was written by vocalist and rhythm guitarist Courtney Love, lead guitarist Eric Erlandson and Billy Corgan of the Smashing Pumpkins, who contributed to four other songs on Celebrity Skin.

The single was released on vinyl and compact disc in multiple countries, including the United States, United Kingdom, Australia, and Japan. The standard releases of the single feature "Drag" as well as a cover of Bob Dylan's "It's All Over Now, Baby Blue" as B-sides.

"Malibu" was one of Hole's most commercially and critically successful songs. The song peaked at number 3 on the US Modern Rock Tracks chart, and garnered a Grammy nomination in 1999. The song was ranked number 264 on "The 500 Greatest Songs Since You Were Born" list by Blender magazine in 2005. Blender also ranked it number 3 on their list of "The Greatest Songs About California".

Composition
"Malibu" was written by frontwoman Courtney Love, lead guitarist Eric Erlandson, and Billy Corgan. The lyrics were written solely by Love, while the musical composition and arrangements are credited to Love, Erlandson, and Corgan. While it has been speculated that the song was written about Love's husband, Kurt Cobain's stay in a rehabilitation clinic in Malibu, California, Love has stated that the song was actually written about her first boyfriend, Jeff Mann, whom she lived with in Malibu the late mid-1980s. In 2018, Love revealed at a concert with Smashing Pumpkins that the song was initially written for Stevie Nicks.

Release
"Malibu" was released as a single on CD, 7" vinyl, and other formats in the United States, the United Kingdom, and Australia. It was first released in the United States on compact disc on December 29, 1998,  followed by a 7" vinyl release in the United States on May 25, 1999.

The single also includes "Drag", an outtake from Celebrity Skin which was replaced by "Malibu". The song was nominated for a Grammy Award in the Best Rock Performance by a Duo or Group with Vocal field, losing to "Put Your Lights On" by Santana. The single was certified Gold in Australia in 1999, with sales in excess of 40,000.

Reception
Billboard gave the song a positive review, writing: "Detractors of Love and company may consider this the ultimate sellout, but programmers would do well to give this edgy but hooky track a listen. Love sounds downright dainty in comparison with past works—OK, well, tamer anyway—and is accompanied here by some great guitar hooks, swirling harmonies, and a sticky melody that could attract stations that like to maintain a tough exterior without sacrificing accessibility."

Music video
Directed by Paul Hunter, the music video for "Malibu" was shot in the eponymous city on a beach. The video features burning palm trees and the band performing the song. Eric Erlandson is also seen waxing a surfboard, and Melissa Auf der Maur lies on a rock over the ocean. The video also alludes to Baywatch at its conclusion, featuring a mass of lifeguards holding plastic dolls on the beach while Courtney Love walks into the ocean.

Samantha Maloney, who replaced drummer Patty Schemel, appears in the video.

Formats and track listings
All songs written by Courtney Love, Eric Erlandson, and Billy Corgan except where noted.

US 7" single (INTS7-97087)
"Malibu"  – 3:53
"Celebrity Skin"2:43

US promotional CD (PRO-CD-1241)
"Malibu"  – 3:53

US promotional 12" (SAM 197T)"Malibu" (Jason Nevins' Radio Remix)3:45
"Malibu" (Jason Nevins' Holy Mix)6:37
"Malibu" (Jason Nevins Club Control Mix)7:37
"Malibu" (Jason Nevins Full On Club Mix)7:20
"Malibu" (Ted Ottaviano's Endless Summer Mix)7:20
"Malibu" (Ted Ottaviano's Club Mix)3:47UK 7" single (GFS 22369)"Malibu" – 3:53
"Drag" (Love, Erlandson, Melissa Auf der Maur, Jordon Zadorozny)4:52 UK CD single (GFSTD 22369)"Malibu"3:53
"It's All Over Now, Baby Blue"  (Bob Dylan)3:18UK CD Maxi single (GFSXD 22369)"Malibu" – 3:53
"Celebrity Skin" 2:58
"Reasons to Be Beautiful"  (Love, Erlandson, Auf der Maur, Zadorozny, Charlotte Caffey) 5:25Australian CD single (GEFDE-22375)
"Malibu" – 3:53
"Drag" (Love, Erlandson, Auf der Maur, Zadorozny)4:52
"It's All Over Now, Baby Blue" (Dylan)3:18
"Celebrity Skin" 2:43
"Malibu" 3:53

Credits and personnel
All credits adapted from Celebrity Skins liner notes except where noted.

Hole
Courtney Lovelead vocals, guitar 
Eric Erlandsonguitar
Melissa Auf der Maurbass, backing vocals

Guest musicians
Deen Castronovodrums

Production
Michael Beinhornproducer, programming
Eric Erlandsonadditional producer
Paul Northfieldengineer
Chris Lord-Algemixing

Charts

Weekly charts

Release history

Notes

References

Sources

External links
"Malibu" at AllMusic

1998 singles
Hole (band) songs
Songs about California
Songs written by Eric Erlandson
Songs written by Courtney Love
Songs written by Billy Corgan
1998 songs
Geffen Records singles
Song recordings produced by Michael Beinhorn
Music videos directed by Paul Hunter (director)